Saltcoats was a provincial electoral district  for the Legislative Assembly of the province of Saskatchewan, Canada, centred on the town of Saltcoats. One of 25 districts created before the 1st Saskatchewan general election in 1905, it was abolished before the 8th Saskatchewan general election in 1934.

The district was reconstituted before the 1938 election and abolished in 2003 into Canora-Pelly and Melville-Saltcoats. It is now part of the constituency of Melville-Saltcoats.

Members of the Legislative Assembly

1905–1934

1938–2003

Election results

|-

 
|Provincial Rights
|Archibald Crooke Thompson
|align="right"|488
|align="right"|32.66%
|align="right"|–
|- bgcolor="white"
!align="left" colspan=3|Total
!align="right"|1,494
!align="right"|100.00%
!align="right"|

|-

 
|Provincial Rights
|Archibald Crooke Thompson
|align="right"|541
|align="right"|35.06%
|align="right"|+2.40
|- bgcolor="white"
!align="left" colspan=3|Total
!align="right"|1,543
!align="right"|100.00%
!align="right"|

|-

|Independent
|Hugh Alexander Green
|align="right"|254
|align="right"|18.75%
|align="right"|–
|- bgcolor="white"
!align="left" colspan=3|Total
!align="right"|1,355
!align="right"|100.00%
!align="right"|

|-

 
|Conservative
|James Nixon
|align="right"|475
|align="right"|25.93%
|align="right"|-
|- bgcolor="white"
!align="left" colspan=3|Total
!align="right"|1,832
!align="right"|100.00%
!align="right"|

|-

 
|Conservative
|Henry Leppington
|align="right"|1,095
|align="right"|28.86%
|align="right"|+2.93
|- bgcolor="white"
!align="left" colspan=3|Total
!align="right"|3,794
!align="right"|100.00%
!align="right"|

|-

 
|Conservative
|Amos Burkell
|align="right"|1,106
|align="right"|42.52%
|align="right"|+13.66
|- bgcolor="white"
!align="left" colspan=3|Total
!align="right"|2,601
!align="right"|100.00%
!align="right"|

|-

|- bgcolor="white"
!align="left" colspan=3|Total
!align="right"|Acclamation
!align="right"|

|-

|- bgcolor="white"
!align="left" colspan=3|Total
!align="right"|3,807
!align="right"|100.00%
!align="right"|

|-

|Independent
|Amos Burkell
|align="right"|2,403
|align="right"|47.84%
|align="right"|-
|- bgcolor="white"
!align="left" colspan=3|Total
!align="right"|5,023
!align="right"|100.00%
!align="right"|

|-
 
|style="width: 130px"|CCF
|Joseph L. Phelps
|align="right"|3,409
|align="right"|45.29%
|align="right"|–

|- bgcolor="white"
!align="left" colspan=3|Total
!align="right"|7,526
!align="right"|100.00%
!align="right"|

|-
 
|style="width: 130px"|CCF
|Joseph L. Phelps
|align="right"|3,461
|align="right"|50.98%
|align="right"|+5.69

 
|Prog. Conservative
|Rae Melville Salkeld
|align="right"|454
|align="right"|6.69%
|align="right"|-
|- bgcolor="white"
!align="left" colspan=3|Total
!align="right"|6,789
!align="right"|100.00%
!align="right"|

|-

 
|CCF
|Joseph L. Phelps
|align="right"|3,620
|align="right"|43.24%
|align="right"|-7.74

|- bgcolor="white"
!align="left" colspan=3|Total
!align="right"|8,372
!align="right"|100.00%
!align="right"|

|-

 
|CCF
|Linton A. McDonald
|align="right"|3,725
|align="right"|48.22%
|align="right"|+4.98
|- bgcolor="white"
!align="left" colspan=3|Total
!align="right"|7,725
!align="right"|100.00%
!align="right"|

|-

 
|CCF
|Alexander Lukiwski
|align="right"|2,684
|align="right"|36.95%
|align="right"|-11.27

|- bgcolor="white"
!align="left" colspan=3|Total
!align="right"|7,264
!align="right"|100.00%
!align="right"|

|-

 
|CCF
|Frederick Rupert Kirkham
|align="right"|2,251
|align="right"|32.99%
|align="right"|-3.96
 
|Prog. Conservative
|Thomas Jones Neal
|align="right"|793
|align="right"|11.62%
|align="right"|-

|- bgcolor="white"
!align="left" colspan=3|Total
!align="right"|6,823
!align="right"|100.00%
!align="right"|

|-

 
|CCF
|Baldur M. Olson
|align="right"|2,275
|align="right"|32.17%
|align="right"|-0.82
 
|Prog. Conservative
|David Arthur Keyes
|align="right"|1,537
|align="right"|21.73%
|align="right"|+10.11
|- bgcolor="white"
!align="left" colspan=3|Total
!align="right"|7,072
!align="right"|100.00%
!align="right"|

|-

 
|NDP
|Charles Woolfitt
|align="right"|2,392
|align="right"|34.49%
|align="right"|+2.32
 
|Prog. Conservative
|Cliff Obre
|align="right"|904
|align="right"|13.04%
|align="right"|-8.69
|- bgcolor="white"
!align="left" colspan=3|Total
!align="right"|6,935
!align="right"|100.00%
!align="right"|

|-
 
|style="width: 130px"|NDP
|Ed Kaeding
|align="right"|3,574
|align="right"|50.63%
|align="right"|+16.14

|- bgcolor="white"
!align="left" colspan=3|Total
!align="right"|7,059
!align="right"|100.00%
!align="right"|

|-
 
|style="width: 130px"|NDP
|Ed Kaeding
|align="right"|2,887
|align="right"|40.93%
|align="right"|-9.70
 
|Progressive Conservative
|Wilfred J. Walker
|align="right"|2,109
|align="right"|29.90%
|align="right"|-

|- bgcolor="white"
!align="left" colspan=3|Total
!align="right"|7,054
!align="right"|100.00%
!align="right"|

|-
 
|style="width: 130px"|NDP
|Ed Kaeding
|align="right"|3,354
|align="right"|45.95%
|align="right"|+5.02
 
|Progressive Conservative
|Walt Johnson
|align="right"|3,265
|align="right"|44.73%
|align="right"|+14.83

|- bgcolor="white"
!align="left" colspan=3|Total
!align="right"|7,299
!align="right"|100.00%
!align="right"|

|-
 
|style="width: 130px"|Progressive Conservative
|Walt Johnson
|align="right"|3,921
|align="right"|49.83%
|align="right"|+5.10
 
|NDP
|Ed Kaeding
|align="right"|3,531
|align="right"|44.88%
|align="right"|-1.07

|- bgcolor="white"
!align="left" colspan=3|Total
!align="right"|7,868
!align="right"|100.00%
!align="right"|

|-
 
|style="width: 130px"|Progressive Conservative
|Walt Johnson
|align="right"|3,612
|align="right"|47.47%
|align="right"|-2.36
 
|NDP
|Reg Knezacek
|align="right"|3,549
|align="right"|46.64%
|align="right"|+1.76

|- bgcolor="white"
!align="left" colspan=3|Total
!align="right"|7,609
!align="right"|100.00%
!align="right"|

|-
 
|style="width: 130px"|NDP
|Reg Knezacek
|align="right"|3,745
|align="right"|52.49%
|align="right"|+5.85
 
|Prog. Conservative
|Rod Roden
|align="right"|2,356
|align="right"|33.03%
|align="right"|-14.44

|- bgcolor="white"
!align="left" colspan=3|Total
!align="right"|7,134
!align="right"|100.00%
!align="right"|

See also
Saltcoats – Northwest Territories territorial electoral district (1870–1905).

Electoral district (Canada)
List of Saskatchewan provincial electoral districts
List of Saskatchewan general elections
List of political parties in Saskatchewan
Saltcoats, Saskatchewan

References
 Saskatchewan Archives Board – Saskatchewan Election Results By Electoral Division

Former provincial electoral districts of Saskatchewan